João Hernani Rosa Barros (born 19 April 1986) is an Angolan former footballer who last played for home country club Progresso do Sambizanga in the Girabola as a striker. He is a former member of the Angola national football team, having played at the 2012 Africa Cup of Nations.

He is a brother of Recreativo do Libolo basketball player Mílton Barros.

References

External links 
 UK Eurosport profile
 Football Database profile
 CAN 2012 profile

1986 births
Living people
Angolan footballers
Angola international footballers
2012 Africa Cup of Nations players

Association football forwards